Eric Cameron  (born Leicester, UK in 1935) is a Canadian artist living in Calgary, Alberta known for his conceptual art work.

Career
Cameron was educated at the University of Durham, and the Courtauld Institute. His earlier works include the Process Paintings produced with masking tape grids and often brightly coloured, mostly from the 1960s. His videotapes date mainly from 1973 to 1976. In 1979, Eric Cameron began applying coats of gesso to some objects that just happened to be lying around his Halifax apartment. Since then, a total of sixty or so Thick Paintings have been initiated; about half are in museum collections across Canada, while the rest continue to be worked on.

Eric Cameron has taught a total of 47 years at universities in England and Canada until 2020 and was the recipient of the 1992 Canada Council’s Victor Martyn Lynch-Staunton Award and the Governor General's Award in 2004. He is a member of the Royal Canadian Academy of Arts. His works are held in the collections of the Glenbow Museum and the National Gallery of Canada.

References

Bibliography

External links
Gallery 1.1.1
Canadian Encyclopedia
CBC Artspots

Canadian contemporary artists
Canadian conceptual artists
Living people
Alumni of Durham University
Artists from Calgary
English emigrants to Canada
1935 births
Members of the Royal Canadian Academy of Arts
Governor General's Award in Visual and Media Arts winners